{| 

{{Infobox ship career
|Hide header=
|Ship country=United States 
|Ship flag=
|Ship name=*Sierra  (1900)
|Ship owner=*Oceanic Steamship Company
|Ship operator= Capt. H. C. Houdlette
|Ship registry=* San Francisco (by 1900)
|Ship route=
|Ship ordered=
|Ship builder=
|Ship original cost=
|Ship yard number=
|Ship way number=
|Ship laid down=
|Ship launched=29 May 1900
|Ship completed=
|Ship christened=
|Ship acquired=
|Ship maiden voyage=
|Ship in service=
|Ship out of service=
|Ship identification=
|Ship fate=Broken up 1934
|Ship notes=
}}

|}

S.S. Sierra was a Lloyd's Register (100 AI) 10,000 tons oceanic passenger and cargo ship completed in 1900 by the Oceanic Steamship company. The Sierra completed its 100th voyage between San Francisco and Honolulu on March 1914.

History
Prior to its Island service, the Sierra had 40 visits to Honolulu in the Australian service. Captain H. C. Houdlette was in command of the vessel. In 1909, the Sierra was overhauled for service between San Francisco and Honolulu. She took the place of the steamer Alameda.

The Sierra operated between San Francisco and Honolulu on the line's John D. Spreckels & Bros. Co., service and was equipped with wireless apparatus with accommodations for first class, second class and "between decks" passengers.

The steam had double bottoms, water tight compartments, two sets of triple expansion engines developing over 8,000 horsepower, and twin screws capable of driving the vessel over 17 knots an hour. The Sierra had bilge Keel and wireless equipment.

Captain H. C. Houdlette, commanded the S. S. Sierra. He completed its 100th voyage between San Francisco and Honolulu. March 2, 1914.

The Sierra was a favorite honeymoon ship for passengers wanting to travel from California to Honolulu, Hawaii.

Her sister ships were the S. S. Sonoma (1900) and the S. S. Ventura'' (1900). In 1934, Yuji Kimoto of Osaka, Japan bought the ships from the Oceanic Steamship Company for the price of $59,500 each.

References

External links
John D. Spreckels
S.S. Sierra, Oceanic S.S. Co.

1900 ships
Passenger ships of the United States
Steamships